McCullough House may refer to:

United States
(by state)
McCullough House, a women's dorm at Hoosac School, Hoosick Falls, New York
John McCullough House, listed on the NRHP in Cumberland County, Pennsylvania
Charles S. McCullough House, Darlington, South Carolina, listed on the NRHP in Darlington County, South Carolina
John Hunter House (Franklin, Tennessee), also known as McCullough House, NRHP-listed
Park-McCullough Historic House, North Bennington, Vermont, NRHP-listed

See also
 Alan McCullough (architect), who designed houses in Virginia